The AR engine family is an Inline-4 piston engine series by Toyota, first introduced in 2008 for the RAV4, and subsequently for the Highlander, Venza, Camry and Scion tC.

The AR series uses a die-cast aluminium engine block and aluminium DOHC cylinder head. The engine series shares many of the technologies in the AZ engine, while incorporating new features such as variable valve timing on both intake and exhaust camshafts or dual VVT-i, low friction technologies including an offset crankshaft, roller rockers for the valvetrain, a three-stage variable oil pump, reduced-tension piston rings and auxiliary belt drive. An Acoustic Control Induction System switches the length of the intake tract in two stages, based on rpm and throttle angle, thereby ensuring strong torque across a broad engine speed range. New tumble control valves enhances combustion while the engine is cold, and helps to bring the catalytic converters up to working temperature quickly. The Tumble control valves, along with new 12-hole high atomizing long-nozzle fuel injectors, reduce the amount of fuel adhering to the intake ports and therefore maximize fuel economy and reduce harmful emissions.

The cylinder block is an open-deck, midi-skirt type with cast-in iron liners and a die-cast aluminium lower crankcase and a stamped oil pan. The forged steel crankshaft is fully balanced with eight counterweights and supported by five main bearings. A helical gear pressed in No. 3 counterweight drives twin contra-rotating balance shafts in the shaft housing within the lower crankcase.

The AR engine replaces the AZ engine.



1AR-FE 

A 2.7 L version of the AR family, first released in the Venza and Highlander in late 2008.

The 1AR-FE most likely ended production in 2020. No official statements were made by Toyota about the engine's status, however, no new cars used this engine after 2020. It was replaced by the A25A-FKS hybrid engine.

Applications:
 Toyota Venza AGV10/15,  at 5800 rpm,  at 4200 rpm
 Toyota Highlander ASU40,  at 5800 rpm,  at 4100 rpm
 Toyota Highlander ASU50
 Toyota Sienna ASU40,  at 5800 rpm,  at 4100 rpm
 Lexus RX AGL10,  at 5800 rpm,  at 4200 rpm

2AR-FE 

A 2.5 L version of the AR family, first released in the RAV4 in the U.S. and Canada in 2008. This engine also replaced the 2AZ-FE in the U.S. and Canada Camry in early 2009, giving 11% better fuel economy.
The engine service mass is 324 lb (147 kg) that includes the oil and coolant fully filled.
The engine is used in the U.S., Australia, New Zealand, China, Taiwan, Korea, Malaysia, Philippines, Thailand and Indonesia.

Applications:

 Toyota RAV4 (ASA33/38),  at 6000 rpm,  at 4000 rpm.
 Toyota RAV4 (ASA40/44),  at 6000 rpm,  at 4000 rpm.

 Toyota Camry ASV40 (Base & LE),  at 6000 rpm,  at 4100 rpm
 Toyota Camry ASV40 (SE and worldwide)  at 6000 rpm,  at 4100 rpm.
 Toyota Camry ASV50,  at 6000 rpm,  at 4100 rpm * Include the Flexifuel Version (2AR-FBE)
 Scion tC (AGT20), 
 Toyota Alphard (AH30)
 Lexus ES250 (XV60)

2AR-FXE 

The 2AR-FXE  is an Atkinson cycle variant of the 2AR-FE. It has the same bore and stroke, but the cams and pistons are unique. Only the intake valves are variable with VVT-i. Geometrical compression ratio is 12.5:1

The large valve overlap leads to a reduction in cylinder charge and reduced torque and power output, but efficiency is increased. This combination makes the 2AR-FXE suitable for use in hybrid vehicles, where peak torque and power demands can be met by the electric motor and battery. Maximum output of the engine when used in the Camry hybrid is 154 hp with 153 lb·ft of torque.

Applications:
 Toyota Camry Hybrid (XV50)
 Toyota Avalon Hybrid (XX40)
 Toyota Harrier Hybrid (XU60)
 Lexus NX 300h (AZ10)
 Toyota Alphard/Vellfire Hybrid/Crown Vellfire (AH30)
 Lexus ES 300h (XV60)
 Toyota RAV4 Hybrid (XA40)
 Lexus LM 300h (AH30)
 Toyota Sienna Hybrid (4th gen)

2AR-FSE 

The 2AR-FSE  is a variant of the 2AR-FE equipped with D4-S direct-injection and port injection. It has the same bore and stroke as other 2AR engines but the cylinder head, cams, pistons and fuel management system are unique.
Maximum thermal efficiency is about 38.5%. The expansion ratio is 13.0 to 1.

Applications:

Lexus IS 300h
Toyota Crown (S210)
Lexus GS 300h

5AR-FE 

A 2.5 L version of the AR family, first released in the RAV4 in China in 2013.

Applications:

 Toyota RAV4
 Toyota Camry

6AR-FSE 

The 6AR-FSE is a 4-cylinder, 1998 cc, twincam, petrol engine equipped with D4-S direct fuel injection and VVT-iW.
It can work in the Otto cycle and a modified-Atkinson cycle depending on output power.
It was first introduced in the Camry in December 2014 for the Chinese market and March 2015 for the Thai market.

Applications:

Camry 2.0 (XV50, Russia, China, Thailand)
Camry 2.0 (XV70, Myanmar, Vietnam, Cambodia, Kazakhstan models, and China only in 2017-2018)
Lexus ES 200 (XV60)

6AR-FBS 
The 6AR-FBS is a 4-cylinder, 1998 cc, twincam, petrol engine equipped with D4-S direct fuel injection and VVT-iW.
It can work in the Otto cycle and a modified-Atkinson cycle depending on output power.
It was first introduced in the Camry in October 2018 for the Thai market.

Applications:

Camry 2.0 (XV70, Russia, Thailand, Singapore, China)

8AR-FTS 

A 2.0 L turbocharged direct-injected member of the AR family, fitted with VVT-iW it is able to operate in both the Otto and a modified-Atkinson cycle. Debuted in the Lexus NX200t. The 8AR-FTS engine has Lexus’ ESTEC D-4ST (Economy with Superior Thermal Efficient Combustion Direct injection 4-stroke with Turbo) fuel injection. With separate twin injectors for both direct and port injection, ESTEC D-4ST could perform high-pressure direct injection into the cylinder and conventional intake port injection, or direct cylinder injection only, according to engine speed. Power output in some applications, e.g.

Applications:
Lexus NX 200t (renamed NX 300) AGZ10/15
Lexus IS 200t (renamed IS 300) ASE30
Lexus GS 200t (renamed GS 300) ARL10
Lexus RX 200t (renamed RX 300) AGL20/25
Toyota Crown ARS210/ARS220
Lexus RC 200t (renamed RC 300) ASC10
Toyota Highlander (XU50, China)
Toyota Harrier Turbo (XU60, Japan, 2017–2020) ASU60

Production
In Japan built by Toyota Motor Corporation in Kamigo Plant and by Toyota Industries Corporation.
Toyota Motor Manufacturing Alabama, Inc. (TMMAL) started building the AR 2.5L and 2.7L engines beginning in mid-2011.

GAC Toyota Engine Co., Ltd Guangqi, China, announced start of AR 2.5L and 2.7L engine production November 2011

Toyota Australia officially opened its new engine plant producing both petrol and hybrid engine variants in Melbourne.

See also
List of Toyota engines
List of Toyota transmissions

References 

AR
Straight-four engines
Gasoline engines by model